United States Army General David Petraeus has given several reports on the state of Iraq:
Initial Benchmark Assessment Report, the interim report released July 12, 2007
Report to Congress on the Situation in Iraq, the report delivered to the U.S. Congress on September 10, 2007

See also
Petraeus scandal